Mazhar Tirmazi (born September 26, 1950) is a London-based Punjabi poet  and journalist. His poem, UmraN LangiaN PabaN Bhaar (A Lifetime on Tiptoes — Healing the Wounds of Partition), was adapted for a Ghazal rendition by Asad Amanat Ali Khan and is widely acclaimed.

Works 
Poetry
Jãgda Sufna (Dream of Awakening; 1983)
Thandi Bhubal (Cold Ashes; 1986)
Kãya Kãgad (The Body is Paper; 1998)
Dooja Hath Sawãli (My Other Pleading Hand; 2001)

Theatre
 UmraN LangiaN PabaN Bhaar (A Lifetime on Tiptoes — Healing the Wounds of Partition), nominated for Amnesty International's Freedom of Expression Award at the 2007 Edinburgh Festival.

References 

1950 births
Living people
British poets
Punjabi-language poets